SIXTEEN is the debut feature from award-winning director Rob Brown starring Roger Nsengiyumva, Rosie Day, Rachael Stirling, Fady Elsayed, Sam Spruell, and Deon Williams. Sixteen was first premiered at the 2013 BFI London Film Festival. It was nominated for The Sutherland Award for Best Debut Feature, and director Rob Brown was nominated for Best British Newcomer.

British thriller drama films
2013 films
2010s English-language films
2010s British films
 Black British films